An abbreviation is a shortened form of a word or a phrase. 

Abbreviation may also refer to:

 Abbreviation (music)
 <abbr/>, an HTML element
 Abbreviations.com, an online dictionary

See also 
 Abbreviator, a writer in the Catholic church